Chrysostomos II may refer to:

 Archbishop Chrysostomos II of Athens (1880–1968), Archbishop of Athens and All Greece in 1962–1967
 Chrysostomos II of Cyprus (born 1941), current archbishop of Cyprus from 2006
 Chrysostomos II Kioussis (1920–2010), Archbishop of Athens and All Greece of a Greek Old Calendarist group in 1986–2010